The 1982 Australian Individual Speedway Championship was held at the Claremont Speedway in Perth, Western Australia on 15 January 1982. Sydney rider Billy Sanders won his fourth Australian Championship and his third in a row. Sanders and fellow Sydney rider Gary Guglielmi finished the meeting on 14 points, with Sanders winning a runoff to claim the title. Local Perth rider Glyn Taylor, the son of 1966 Australian champion Chum Taylor, finished third on 11 points.

1982 Australian Solo Championship
 Australian Championship
 15 January 1982
  Perth, Western Australia - Claremont Speedway
 Referee: 
 Qualification: The top four riders go through to the Overseas Final in London, England.

References

See also
 Australia national speedway team
 Sport in Australia
 Motorcycle Speedway

Speedway in Australia
Australia
Individual Speedway Championship